Kurban Tulum (1883 – May 26, 1975), also called Uncle Kurban, was a Uyghur who lived in Yutian County, Xinjiang, China in what was the Keriya oasis. He has been promoted by the Communist Party of China as a symbol of unity with the Uyghurs.

Life
According to local cadre, prior to the arrival of the Communist Party, Kurban was a peasant who worked as a seasonal laborer for Uyghur landlords. During the land reforms of 1952, Kurban received land and various other properties. He is said to have visited Ürümqi, the political center of Xinjiang, by riding a donkey, to show his appreciation of the People's Liberation Army's role in the liberation of his area. He tried to hitchhike to Beijing, but was unsuccessful.

In May 1958, he was chosen as part of the agricultural delegation to Beijing. The delegation reached Beijing on June 18, and they met with Mao Zedong on June 28, 1958.

He was elected as one of the delegates to the 2nd National People's Congress in 1959 and 4th National People's Congress in 1975.

Legacy
Today, the monuments of his shaking hands with Chairman Mao stand at the center of Keriya and in Tuanjie Square of Hotan, the center of his area.

A song "Where Are You Going, Uncle Kurban?" was later made and a film Uncle Kurban Visits Beijing was made in 2002. He is a well-known figure in China as his name also appears in the school textbooks.

A 2019 TV series Uncle Kurban and His Descendants dramatized the overthrow of his landlord and his descendant's career in becoming an officer in PLA Navy.

See also
 Propaganda in the People's Republic of China

References

Uyghur politicians
Hotan Prefecture
Propaganda in China
Delegates to the 2nd National People's Congress
Delegates to the 4th National People's Congress
1883 births
1975 deaths